Antczak is a Polish surname. Notable people with the surname include:

 Jakub Antczak (born 2004), Polish footballer
 Jerzy Antczak (born 1929), Polish film director
 Zdzisław Antczak (1947–2019), Polish handball player

Polish-language surnames